Richard Dixon may refer to:

 Richard Dixon (sailor) (1865–1949), British sailor who competed in the 1908 Summer Olympics
 Richard Dixon (communist) (1905–1976), Australian communist leader
 Richard Dixon (scientist) (born 1930), British chemist
 Richard Dixon (translator) (born 1956), British translator 
 Richard Dixon (footballer, born 1990), Jamaican-American footballer
 Richard Dixon (footballer, born 1992), Panamanian footballer
 Richard Dixon (bishop), Bishop of Cork and Cloyne
 Richard Clay Dixon, American politician in Ohio
 Richard N. Dixon (1938–2012), American politician in Maryland
 Richard Watson Dixon (1833–1900), English poet and divine
 Richard Dixon (USCG), heroic coxswain of a USCG motor lifeboat who has had a Sentinel-class cutter named in his honor
 USCGC Richard Dixon (WPC-1113), the thirteenth Sentinel-class cutter
 Ricky Dixon (born 1969), Nicaragua judoka
 Richard Dixon (biologist), professor at the University of North Texas
 Richard Frederick Dixon, convicted of the 1971 hijacking of a passenger aircraft to Cuba and of the 1976 murder of a police officer

See also
 Richard Dickson (disambiguation)

Dixon, Richard